The 1996–97 French Rugby Union Championship was played by 20 teams

Stade Toulousain won their 14th title, beating Bourgoin in the final.

Preliminary round 

The 20 team were divided in the preliminary phase in two pools of 10. The first eight team of each pool were admitted to "Round of 16". The last two were relegated in second division.

Last 16

Last 8

Semifinals

Final 

French Rugby Chanmpionship
French rugby union championship
Championship